The Gräfenberg Railway is the railway line from the Nuremberg Nordost station via Heroldsberg, Kalchreuth and Eschenau to Gräfenberg. It is a successful reference project for the revitalisation of railway lines threatened with closure.

Services 
Passenger services are operated by DB Regio. They are in integrated into the Nuremberg Regional Transport Association (Verkehrsverbund Großraum Nuremberg) and designated as line R 21.

Future
An electrification of this line has variously been debated as has been extending passenger service along the Nuremberg Ringbahn. There have also been calls for additional stops in the northern Nuremberg boroughs of Ziegelstein and Buchenbühl which had had stops in the past.

Gallery

References

External links 

 1944 timetable
 Page on the Gräfenberg Railway (private)
 Route description at Nahverkehr Franken (private)

Branch lines in Bavaria
Forchheim (district)
Buildings and structures in Erlangen-Höchstadt
Rail transport in Nuremberg